Rickleton is an area of Washington, in the City of Sunderland metropolitan borough in Tyne and Wear, England. It is located on the south side of Washington.

Transport
The village has roads forming a loop around the village, these roads are called Rickleton Way, Bonemill lane and Picktree Lane. The village has a bus service operated by Go North East.

The nearest railway station is Chester-le-Street railway station.

References

External links

Populated places in Tyne and Wear
Washington, Tyne and Wear